Stephanie Rabih El Kazzi (born 29 September 2004) is a Lebanese footballer who plays as a defender for Lebanese club EFP.

Club career 
El Kazzi played for Zouk Mosbeh, before moving to EFP.

International career
El Kazzi made her senior international debut for Lebanon on 24 August 2021, as a substitute in a 0–0 draw against Tunisia in the 2021 Arab Women's Cup.

Honours
Lebanon U18
 WAFF U-18 Girls Championship: 2022

See also
 List of Lebanon women's international footballers

References

External links
 
 

2004 births
Living people
People from Matn District
Lebanese women's footballers
Women's association football defenders
Zouk Mosbeh SC footballers
Eleven Football Pro players
Lebanese Women's Football League players
Lebanon women's youth international footballers
Lebanon women's international footballers